During the 1999–2000 Dutch football season, PSV Eindhoven competed in the Eredivisie.

Season summary
PSV claimed the Eredivisie title with a margin of 16 points between them and second-placed Heerenveen, scoring 105 goals in the process.

Kit
PSV's kit was manufactured by Nike and sponsored by Philips

First-team squad
Squad at end of season

Transfers

In
  Johann Vogel -  Grasshoppers
  Mark van Bommel -  Fortuna Sittard
  Ivica Kralj -  Porto
  Eric Addo -  Club Brugge, fl.5.9m

Out
  Gilles De Bilde -  Sheffield Wednesday, August

Results

Champions League

Third qualifying round
 FC Zimbru Chișinău 0-0 PSV
 PSV 2-0 FC Zimbru Chișinău

Group stage

References

PSV Eindhoven seasons
PSV Eindhoven
Dutch football championship-winning seasons